The 2016 United States Senate election in New Hampshire was held November 8, 2016, to elect a member of the United States Senate to represent the State of New Hampshire, concurrently with the 2016 U.S. presidential election, as well as other elections to the United States Senate in other states and elections to the United States House of Representatives and various state and local elections. The primary election to select the candidates who appeared on the general election ballot took place on September 13, 2016.

Incumbent Republican Senator Kelly Ayotte ran for re-election to a second term in office and won the primary by a wide margin. The Governor of New Hampshire Maggie Hassan chose not to seek reelection to a third term as governor and instead sought the nomination of the Democratic Party for the Senate. Hassan was unopposed in the Democratic primary and won the general election by 1,017 votes, representing a winning margin of approximately 0.14%. This made the election the closest race of the 2016 Senate election cycle, and also the closest race in a New Hampshire Senate election since the disputed 1974–75 election. Hassan became the first Democratic senator elected in this seat since the latter election.

The Democratic Party also flipped New Hampshire’s 1st congressional district in the concurrent House election, thus marking the first time since 1854 that New Hampshire had an entirely Democratic congressional delegation.

As of 2022, this remains the last time that a Democratic candidate for Senate in New Hampshire has failed to win a majority of the vote, or Republican carried any county other than Belknap or Coös.

Republican primary 
Ayotte was predicted to face opposition in the primary from a Tea Party candidate. In October 2013, former New Hampshire Republican State Committee Chairman Jack Kimball said: "There is no question in my mind that she will garner a primary challenger". Ultimately, she faced only token opposition.

Candidates

Declared 
 Tom Alciere
 Kelly Ayotte, incumbent U.S. Senator
 Gerald Beloin, perennial candidate
 Stanley Emanuel
 Jim Rubens, former state senator, candidate for governor in 1998 and candidate for U.S. Senate in 2014

Declined 
 Ovide Lamontagne, attorney, candidate for the U.S. Senate in 2010 and nominee for governor in 1996 and 2012
 Andrew Hemingway, businessman and candidate for governor in 2014
 Bill O'Brien, state representative and former Speaker of the New Hampshire House of Representatives

Polling

Results

Democratic primary

Candidates

Declared 
 Maggie Hassan, Governor of New Hampshire

Declined 

 Paul Hodes, former U.S. Representative and 2010 nominee
 Mark Connolly, former deputy secretary of state and director of securities regulation (running for governor)
 John Lynch, former governor of New Hampshire
 Ann McLane Kuster, U.S. Representative (running for re-election)
 Shawn O'Connor, businessman (running for NH-01)
 Carol Shea-Porter, former U.S. Representative (running for NH-01)
 Colin Van Ostern, Executive Councilor (running for governor)

Libertarian convention 
On Saturday, January 16, 2016, the Libertarian Party of New Hampshire selected Brian Chabot to be their nominee for the U.S. Senate.

General election

Candidates 
 Kelly Ayotte (R), incumbent senator
 Maggie Hassan (D), Governor of New Hampshire
 Brian Chabot (L)
 Aaron Day (I), former chairman of the Free State Project and conservative activist

Debates

Endorsements

Predictions

Polling

with Kelly Ayotte

with Jim Rubens

with Ovide Lamontagne

Fundraising

Results

Allegations of voting irregularities 
In February 2017, President Donald Trump (who had endorsed Ayotte) told a gathering of senators at the White House that fraudulent out-of-state voting had cost him and Ayotte the election in New Hampshire. On September 7, state House speaker Shawn Jasper (who also had endorsed Ayotte) alleged that voter fraud swung the election. He made the allegations based on a report by the New Hampshire House of Representatives saying that of the 6,540 voters who had registered to vote on Election Day, only 1,014 of those voters had obtained a New Hampshire drivers license by August 30 of the following year. The Washington Post was able to quickly contact 3 such voters who said that they were college students and kept the drivers license from their home state.

Several investigations by New Hampshire's Ballot Law Commission found no evidence of widespread fraud, and only 4 instances of fraud total in the state for the 2016 elections. Specifically addressing the claim of people being bussed in from out of state to vote, Associate Attorney General Anne Edwards noted that they found no evidence for such claims. When they investigated these claims, they found that the buses were chartered out of state, but the voters on the buses lived in New Hampshire and could legally vote there.

See also 
 United States Senate elections, 2016

References

External links 
Official campaign websites
 Kelly Ayotte (R) for Senate
 Maggie Hassan (D) for Senate
 Brian Chabot (L) for Senate

New Hampshire
2016
United States Senate